The Loft is a 2014 erotic thriller film directed by Erik Van Looy. It is a remake of the 2008 Dutch-language Belgian film Loft, which Van Looy also directed. The screenplay was written by Bart De Pauw and adapted by Wesley Strick. Starring Karl Urban, James Marsden, and Wentworth Miller, it also features Matthias Schoenaerts who reprises his role from the original film.

The film was shot in mid-2011, but its theatrical release was delayed by a change of the film distributor. Dark Castle Entertainment originally acquired the US distribution rights, as they did for Splice, with the intention of releasing the film through Warner Bros. When Joel Silver moved his office to Universal Studios, he took Dark Castle, and the film with him. Universal planned to release the film on August 29, 2014, but the studio pulled it from the schedule in favor of Legendary Pictures' As Above, So Below. Universal and Dark Castle dropped the film, which was then picked up by Open Road Films, who released it on January 30, 2015. Universal retained the US home entertainment rights through its ancillaries deal with Open Road. Dark Castle did not release another film until 2017's Suburbicon with Paramount Pictures.

Plot
Five married men share ownership of an upmarket loft, which they use for discreetly meeting their respective mistresses. When the body of a murdered woman is found in that loft, the men begin to suspect each other of having committed the gruesome crime, as they are the only ones with keys to the premises. Through flashbacks, which are intertwined with scenes from the present, the story is unravelled.

The five men are: 
 Vincent Stevens: architect and designer of the building where the loft is situated. Married to Barbara and father of their children, he initially suggests the five friends use the loft as a private oasis. He is set up by the other men to be accused of the murder.
 Dr. Chris Vanowen: a psychiatrist married to Allison and half-brother to Philip. Chris and Philip have a half-sister, Zoe. He is the most reluctant of the men to loft idea and the last to accept a key; Chris eventually does so because he is attracted to Ann, who eventually becomes his mistress. Ann warns Chris not to fall in love with her because she is a prostitute, and he gives her his key as proof he does not use the loft with other women.
 Luke Seacord: married to Ellie, who is an insulin-dependent diabetic. He discovers the body in the loft and initially calls Vincent and the others over. The police later insinuate that Luke is attracted to Vincent, and it is Luke who records the men's activities in the loft without their knowledge.
 Marty Landry: heavy drinker and an obvious lecherer. He and his wife Mimi separate when a woman Marty slept with on a business trip shows up at his home.
 Philip Williams: half-brother to Chris as they have the same mother and recently married to Vicky, the only daughter of a wealthy property developer who is also Philip’s boss. Philip is a drug user who grew up in a dysfunctional household with his abusive father and is very protective of his younger sister Zoe. He warns the other men off having sex with her.

The murder victim is Sarah Deakins. Vincent, Luke, and Marty meet her at a bar and though both Vincent and Luke are attracted to her, she hooks up with Vincent and becomes attached to him. At a party Vincent and Luke are attending, Sarah threatens to tell Vincent's wife about the affair in a bid to break them up, but she is dissuaded from this by Luke. She seemingly tries to commit suicide at the loft by taking pills with champagne and is discovered by Luke, who calls Chris, Marty and Philip, showing them a note left for Vincent. The note reads "See you in the next life"; this note is taken from the loft by Chris.

The men were motivated to set Vincent up by Luke, who showed them DVDs of Vincent having sex with Marty's wife, Mimi; Chris's prostitute, Ann (whom Vincent had paid to allow Chris to seduce her, so that he would take a key to and use the loft), and Zoe, Philip and Chris's younger sister. Three of the men leave to set up their alibis, with Philip remaining at the loft to stage the scene. He takes some cocaine and cuts Sarah's wrists, using her bloodied finger to write a Latin phrase similar to that in her suicide note. He then handcuffs Sarah's right hand to the bed.

Over the course of the movie, as the five men discuss what to do with the body, Luke, Chris, Marty, and Philip drug Vincent, strip and handcuff him to the body on the bed. Before Vincent passes out completely, Chris tells him about Sarah's suicide and the contents of her note. While being questioned by the police, Vincent tells them of the setup, but they do not believe him as the only prints found were Vincent's and Sarah's. They also have the DVDs of his sexual exploits, except the ones with Mimi, Ann, and Zoe; they won't believe him that Luke made the videos and the DVDs of the other men were not found. The police also mention that all four men have alibis for that morning — Chris and Luke were seen together having breakfast, Marty was at his office, Philip has an alibi from his father-in-law (who was blackmailed with information about his own cheating, information Philip had because he knew Vincent used that same information to blackmail his father-in-law to be awarded a contract on a project).

Releasing Chris from interrogation, Detective Huggins tells him that Vincent has been arrested for murder; he is surprised as he thought Vincent would only be implicated in Sarah's suicide. The detective further states that the pills did not kill Sarah, that her wrist cuts were not self-inflicted, the prints on the knife were Vincent's and they didn't find a suicide note. The surprised Chris thanks Huggins and leaves. Outside the police station, he reaches into his jacket pocket, only to find that the suicide note Luke gave to him is gone. He then walks to the loft and confronts Luke about the missing note. After initially denying that he had it, Luke leads Chris to the note, which was in the garbage. Chris looks at the note and wonders why Luke would get rid of the only evidence of the attempted suicide, speculating that Luke, not Sarah, was the author of the note. Luke then tells Chris everything; he framed Vincent, because he was attracted to Sarah himself, and felt that Vincent stood between him and Sarah.

We see that Luke had gone after Sarah the night she almost told Vincent's wife about the affair. He told her that Vincent was using her and not worth it, and that he could treat her better. She rebuffs him, saying she felt nothing for Luke. Hurt, Luke turns around to find that his wife saw him talking to Sarah. When Sarah returned to visit Vincent at the loft, Luke showed up and drugged Sarah, trying to kill her — out of "love" — with an insulin overdose. He then staged the suicide with the pills, champagne bottle, and suicide note. Chris then tells him that Vincent is being charged with murder as Sarah hadn't been dead when they left her with Philip. Luke then states that technically it was Philip who killed Sarah and that he will clean the situation up. When Chris says no more cleaning up, Luke pulls out a kitchen knife and threatens him. Sirens can be heard and Chris says he called the police, told them everything and that it is over. He and Luke struggle, and he gets the knife from Luke. Luke tells Chris to tell Ellie and his family that he's sorry; he then jumps from the loft's balcony, killing himself.

Six months later, Mimi and Marty are reconciled, Philip is facing trial for manslaughter, and Chris is divorced, sharing custody of his children. He runs into Ann after leaving a bar, and she asks if he needs the loft key, that he had given her for them to meet up. Chris mentions the key would not work as Vincent now lives at the loft, since it was all his wife left him with from their divorce. Chris mentions that he heard Ann left the city councilman, one of her clients as a prostitute, and she replies that he was not the only thing she gave up, implying that she's no longer in that line of work. Ann asks Chris if he would like to grab a cup of coffee with her as the scene fades away.

Cast

Production
On June 6, 2011, principal photography began in New Orleans. After a few weeks, filming moved to the studios in Brussels, Belgium. Production wrapped up on July 27, 2011.

Release
After several delays, Open Road finally released The Loft on January 30, 2015, in the United States, with a wide release in 1,841 screens.

Reception
On the review aggregator website Rotten Tomatoes, the film holds an approval rating of 14% based on 42 reviews, with an average rating of 3.1/10. The website's critics consensus reads, "Populated with characters as unpleasant as its sleazy storyline, The Loft is uninhabitable for all but the least demanding erotic thriller fans." On Metacritic, the film has a score of 24 out of 100 based on 11 critics, indicating "generally unfavorable reviews". Audiences polled by CinemaScore gave the film a grade of "B−" on an A+ to F scale.

J.R. Jones of the Chicago Reader wrote: "The twisty plot translates to any culture where swinging-dick businessmen cheat on their wives — which is to say, any culture." Jim Lane of the Sacramento News & Review wrote that "the solution is both simple and complicated, and quite satisfying". Jason Best of Movie Talk writes: "The plotting gets too clever by half towards the end, but with striking support from Rachael Taylor and Isabel Lucas this remains a slick and stylish whodunit." Frank Scheck of The Hollywood Reporter praised the cinematography and said that "the film could well serve to encourage both extramarital affairs and the sale of upscale loft apartments". Joe Leydon for Variety writes: "Still, there can be no denying the interest and suspense Van Looy and scripter Wesley Strick generate during the opening scenes as they set the plot mechanics into motion." Roger Moore for Tribune News Service called the film well-cast and said that Schoenaerts "provides some fireworks and the old-fashioned theatricality of it might appeal to some — even Hitchcock himself".

Box office
The Loft grossed $6 million in the United States and $5 million in other territories for a worldwide total of $11 million.

References

External links

 
 
 

2014 films
2014 thriller films
2010s American films
2010s English-language films
2010s erotic thriller films
2010s mystery thriller films
American erotic thriller films
American mystery thriller films
American nonlinear narrative films
American remakes of Belgian films
Belgian erotic thriller films
Belgian mystery thriller films
English-language Belgian films
Erotic mystery films
Films directed by Erik Van Looy
Films produced by Steve Golin
Films scored by John Frizzell (composer)
Films set in apartment buildings
Films shot in Brussels
Films shot in New Orleans
Mystery film remakes
Open Road Films films
Thriller film remakes